Stephen Andrew Perkins (September 13, 1967) is an American musician and songwriter. A drummer and percussionist, he currently plays with Jane's Addiction, Porno for Pyros and Hellride.

Following the dissolution of Jane's Addiction, Perkins continued to play with frontman Perry Farrell in the rock band Porno for Pyros. He also has a solo project called Banyan, and in the 1990s was involved in Lil' Pit with Mike Watt. In 1992, he appeared as percussionist on Rage Against the Machine's "Know Your Enemy" and in 1995, contributed percussion to the Red Hot Chili Peppers songs "One Big Mob" and "Warped" on their album One Hot Minute (fellow Jane's Addiction member Dave Navarro was the guitarist for the Chili Peppers during the making of that album). Perkins also played drums on the Nine Inch Nails album The Downward Spiral on the track "I Do Not Want This". In addition to Banyan, Perkins worked with Jane's Addiction guitarist Dave Navarro, Jane's Addiction bass player Chris Chaney and singer/guitarist Steve Isaacs on a project entitled The Panic Channel from 2004 until 2007. 

Perkins was also involved with members of Suicidal Tendencies in their Infectious Grooves side project, as well as Hellride, a Los Angeles-based Stooges cover band. Jane's Addiction reunited and played at the NME Awards in April 2008, and recorded the album The Great Escape Artist in 2011, and produced a live album Live in NYC, from material recorded during the follow-up tour. The band has played sporadically since 2013, as members have worked on various side projects. Perkins most recently played with the band in February 2020 during a show with the Red Hot Chili Peppers; Perkins also filled in on drums for the Red Hot Chili Peppers at the same show.

Early life
Perkins attended Notre Dame High School in Sherman Oaks, California.

Discography
Jane's Addiction
 1987 Jane's Addiction
 1988 Nothing's Shocking
 1990 Ritual de lo Habitual
 1991 Live and Rare (Compilation of live tracks, demos, and album tracks)
 1997 Kettle Whistle (Compilation of live tracks, demos, new songs and unreleased material)
 2003 Strays
 2006 Up from the Catacombs (Greatest hits album)
 2009 A Cabinet of Curiosities (Box set)
 2011 The Great Escape Artist

Infectious Grooves
 1991 The Plague That Makes Your Booty Move...It's the Infectious Grooves

Porno for Pyros
 1993 Porno for Pyros
 1996 Good God's Urge

Nine Inch Nails
 1994 The Downward Spiral Drum performance for "I Do Not Want This"

Banyan
 1997 Banyan
 1999 Anytime at All
 2004 Live at Perkins' Palace

Perry Farrell
 1999 Rev

The Panic Channel
 2006 (ONe)

Hellflower
 2010 Us You

References

External links
JanesAddiction.org – extensive discography and information

1967 births
Living people
American rock drummers
Songwriters from California
Musicians from Los Angeles
Jane's Addiction members
Porno for Pyros members
American session musicians
20th-century American drummers
American male drummers
Methods of Mayhem members
The Panic Channel members
Class of '99 members